Bageswori may refer to:
Bageswori, Bhaktapur
Bageswori, Parsa